Kai Ebel (30 August 1964) is a German sports journalist. He has worked RTL television channel Formula One broadcast commentator and editor since . He made his debut in 1992 Spanish Grand Prix.

After graduating from high school in Mönchengladbach, Ebel completed his military service and then studied at the German Sport University in Cologne, where he graduated as a sports teacher.

At the end of July 2009, after seven years of partnership, Ebel married the native Romanian painter Mila Wiegand, born as Monica Dragomirescu (born 18 January 1972).

References 

1964 births
Living people
Formula One journalists and reporters